The 2022 All-Big Ten Conference football team consists of American football players chosen as All-Big Ten Conference players for the 2022 Big Ten Conference football season. The conference recognizes two official All-Big Ten selectors: (1) the Big Ten conference coaches selected separate offensive and defensive units and named first-, second- and third-team players (the "Coaches" team); and (2) a panel of sports writers and broadcasters covering the Big Ten also selected offensive and defensive units and named first-, second- and third-team players (the "Media" team).

Key

Offensive selections

Quarterbacks
 C. J. Stroud, Ohio State (Coaches-1; Media-1)
 Aidan O'Connell, Purdue (Coaches-2; Media-3)
 J. J. McCarthy, Michigan (Coaches-3; Media-2)
 Taulia Tagovailoa, Maryland (Coaches-2)

Running backs
 Blake Corum, Michigan (Coaches-1; Media-1)
 Mohamed Ibrahim, Minnesota (Coaches-1; Media-1)
 Braelon Allen, Wisconsin (Coaches-2; Media-2)
 Chase Brown, Illinois (Coaches-2; Media-2)
 Nicholas Singleton, Penn State (Coaches-3; Media-3)
 Miyan Williams, Ohio State (Coaches-3; Media-3)

Wide receivers
 Marvin Harrison Jr., Ohio State (Coaches-1; Media-1)
 Charlie Jones, Purdue (Coaches-1; Media-1)
 Emeka Egbuka, Ohio State (Coaches-2; Media-2)
 Trey Palmer, Nebraska (Coaches-3; Media-2)
 Ronnie Bell, Michigan (Coaches-3; Media-3)
 Jayden Reed, Michigan State (Coaches-2)
 Keon Coleman, Michigan State (Media-3)

Centers
 John Michael Schmitz, Minnesota (Coaches-1; Media-1)
 Olusegun Oluwatimi, Michigan (Coaches-1; Media-2)
 Alex Pihlstrom, Illinois (Coaches-2)
 Juice Scruggs, Penn State (Coaches-3)
 Luke Wypler, Ohio State (Media-3)

Guards
 Zak Zinter, Michigan (Coaches-1; Media-1)
 Trevor Keegan, Michigan (Coaches-1; Media-2)
 Donovan Jackson, Ohio State (Coaches-2; Media-1)
 Matt Jones, Ohio State (Coaches-2; Media-2)
 Axel Ruschmeyer, Minnesota (Coaches-3; Media-3)
 Chuck Filiaga, Minnesota (Coaches-3)
 Isaiah Adams, Illinois (Media-3)

Tackles
 Paris Johnson Jr., Ohio State (Coaches-1; Media-1)
 Peter Skoronski, Northwestern (Coaches-1; Media-2)
 Olu Fashanu, Penn State (Coaches-2; Media-3)
 Ryan Hayes, Michigan (Coaches-2; Media-3)
 Dawand Jones, Ohio State (Coaches-3, Media-2)
 Alex Palczewski, Illinois (Coaches-3, Media-2)

Tight ends
 Sam LaPorta, Iowa (Coaches-1; Media-1)
 Payne Durham, Purdue (Coaches-2; Media-2)
 Luke Schoonmaker, Michigan (Coaches-3)
 Brenton Strange, Penn State (Coaches-3)
 Cade Stover, Ohio State (Media-3)

Defensive selections

Defensive linemen
 Mike Morris, Michigan (Coaches-1; Media-1)
 Jer'Zhan Newton, Illinois (Coaches-1; Media-1)
 Mazi Smith, Michigan (Coaches-1; Media-1)
 J. T. Tuimoloau, Ohio State (Coaches-1; Media-2)
 Zach Harrison, Ohio State (Coaches-2; Media-1)
 Garrett Nelson, Nebraska (Coaches-2; Media-2)
 Lukas Van Ness, Iowa (Coaches-2; Media-2)
 P. J. Mustipher, Penn State (Coaches-2; Media-3)
 Keith Randolph, Illinois (Coaches-3; Media-3)
 Keeanu Benton, Wisconsin (Coaches-3)
 Adisa Isaac, Penn State (Coaches-3)
 Aaron Lewis, Rutgers (Coaches-3)
 Joe Evans, Iowa (Media-2)
 Adetomiwa Adebawore, Northwestern (Media-3)
 Mike Hall, Ohio State (Media-3)

Linebackers
 Jack Campbell, Iowa (Coaches-1; Media-1)
 Tommy Eichenberg, Ohio State (Coaches-1; Media-1)
 Nick Herbig, Wisconsin (Coaches-1; Media-1)
 Seth Benson, Iowa (Coaches-2; Media-2)
 Cal Haladay, Michigan State (Coaches-2; Media-2)
 Junior Colson, Michigan (Coaches-2; Media-3)
 Abdul Carter, Penn State (Coaches-3; Media-2)
 Michael Barrett, Michigan (Coaches-3)
 Mariano Sori-Marin, Minnesota (Coaches-3)
 Bryce Gallagher, Northwestern (Media-3)
 Maema Njongmeta, Wisconsin (Media-3)

Defensive backs
 Joey Porter Jr., Penn State (Coaches-1; Media-1)
 Devon Witherspoon, Illinois (Coaches-1; Media-1)
 Sydney Brown, Illinois (Coaches-1; Media-2)
 Riley Moss, Iowa (Coaches-1; Media-2)
 Cooper DeJean, Iowa (Coaches-2; Media-1)
 John Torchio, Wisconsin (Coaches-2; Media-1)
 Tyler Nubin, Minnesota (Coaches-2; Media-2)
 DJ Turner, Michigan (Coaches-2; Media-3)
 Jartavius Martin, Illinois (Coaches-3; Media-2)
 Ji'Ayir Brown, Penn State (Coaches-3; Media-3)
 Ronnie Hickman, Ohio State (Coaches-3; Media-3)
 Kalen King, Penn State (Coaches-3; Media-3)

Special teams

Kickers
 Jake Moody, Michigan (Coaches-1; Media-1)
 Drew Stevens, Iowa (Coaches-3; Media-2)
 Chad Ryland, Maryland (Coaches-2)
 Noah Ruggles, Ohio State (Media-3)

Punters
 Bryce Baringer, Michigan State (Coaches-1; Media-2)
 Tory Taylor, Iowa (Coaches-3; Media-1)
 Adam Korsak, Rutgers (Coaches-2; Media-3)

Return specialist
 Jaylin Lucas, Indiana (Coaches-1; Media-1)
 A. J. Henning, Michigan (Coaches-2; Media-2)
 Nicholas Singleton, Penn State (Media-2)
 Aron Cruikshank, Rutgers (Coaches-3)
 Jayden Reed, Michigan State (Media-3)

References

All-Big Ten Conference
All-Big Ten Conference football teams